Satyrium liparops, the striped hairstreak, is a butterfly of the family Lycaenidae described by John Eatton Le Conte in 1833. It is found in North America, from the Rocky Mountains south from southern Canada to Colorado, east to Maine and south to Florida.

The wingspan is 25–39 mm. The hindwings have one long and one short tail. The upperside is dark brown. The males have a long, oval spot along the forewing costa. The underside of both wings has rows of widely separated white stripes and a blue spot near the tails, which is topped with orange. The outer margin of the hindwings is indented above the short tail. Adults are on wing from July to August in the north and in May in the south. There is one generation per year. Adults feed on nectar from various flowers, including chinquapin, common milkweed, dogbane, goldenrod, meadowsweet, New Jersey tea, staghorn sumac, viburnum, and white sweet clover.

The larvae feed on the plum and cherry (Prunus species) and hawthorns (Crataegus species). They feed on the buds, leaves, flowers, and young fruit of their host plant.

Subspecies
S. l. aliparops (Michener & dos Passos, 1942) – (Colorado, southern Alberta to Manitoba)
S. l. fletcheri (Michener & dos Passos, 1942) – (Manitoba, northern Ontario to Alberta)
S. l. floridensis Gatrelle, 2001 – (Florida)
S. l. liparops – (Georgia)
S. l. strigosa (Harris, 1862) – (Massachusetts, New England, eastern Canada)

References

Butterflies described in 1833
Satyrium (butterfly)